is a city located in Yamaguchi Prefecture, Japan.

The city was founded on April 1, 1943. It was reorganised with different borders on July 1, 1955, and October 4, 2004.

As of October 1, 2016, the city has an estimated population of 51,040, and a population density of 560 persons per square kilometer (1,450.4 persons per square mile). The name Hikari itself means "brilliance" or "light" in Japanese.

It is connected by railroad with a train station and route 188.

Hikari is bounded with Yanai, Kudamatsu, Shunan, Iwakuni and Tabuse in the Kumage District.

On October 4, 2004, the town of Yamato (from Kumage District) was merged into Hikari.

History

Municipal timeline
October 1, 1940: The town of Shunan was renamed Hikari.
April 1, 1943: The town merged with the town of Murozumi to form the city of Hikari (1st generation).
July 1, 1955: The city (1st generation) merged with the village of Suō to form the new city of Hikari (2nd generation).
April 10, 1957: The city lost parts of Tateno area to the village of Yamato.
October 4, 2004: The city (2nd generation) absorbed the town of Yamato (from Kumage District) to create the new and expanded city of Hikari (3rd generation).

Military
The Hikari Naval Arsenal (or Dockyard) included a fire-control factory, built in 1942, that employed about 600 people.  It was one of the principal establishments for producing the Standard H.A. System (Type 94 Kosha Sochi) at the rate of ~15 per month, along with bomb components, torpedo afterbodies, and misc. machined parts.

The Imperial Japanese Navy formed the Second Special Attack Force (former First Special Base Unit) on March 1, 1945, at Hikari for conducting kaiten attacks. Rear Admiral Nagai Mitsuru was the Commanding Officer.  On that same day, a kaiten crew training unit is also formed at Hirao, SE of Hikari.
This was one of four such kaiten training bases.

With hints of cessation of hostilities, bombing raids by U.S. forces were canceled.  However, resumption of bombing was ordered on August 13, 1945.
The Hikari Naval Arsenal was consequently bombed the next day on August 14, 1945 (one day before the end of war), taking 738 lives.
The attacking U.S. aircraft were 156 B-29 bombers of the 40th Bomb Group
stationed in Saipan, supported by P-51 Mustangs from Iwo Jima.  
The 40th Bomb Group dropped 3,540 bombs (885 tons) on the Hikari Naval Arsenal, resulting in severe destruction.
Including this bombing, Hikari lost more than 1,200 citizens in World War II, both military and civilian.  
After surrender, Allied forces found 52 kaiten at Hikari and destroyed them.

The former Hikari Naval Arsenal is now the sites for Nippon Steel Corporation
 and vaccine manufacturing by Takeda Pharmaceutical Company.  
Takeda discovered the hull of a Type 4 Kaiten under one of the buildings in August 1989, an attestation to the history of the site.

The Kaiten Monument, erected in 1996, honors Hikari Naval Arsenal kaiten pilots.  Steel frames that once constituted the structure of the destroyed Hikari Naval Arsenal were used to build the Tsukumo Bridge.

References

External links

 

 
Cities in Yamaguchi Prefecture
Port settlements in Japan
Populated coastal places in Japan